Gigabit Video Interface (GVIF) is a digital video serial interface developed by Sony in 1996 for high quality uncompressed video transmission from digital video hardware. It is intended primarily for automotive applications. It is compatible with the HDCP encryption system.

GVIF transmits uncompressed serial data at speeds up to 1.95 Gbit/s. GVIF transmits over a single differential pair, as a result, the cable is thin.  Transmission distances up to ten meters are possible.

Utilisation 
The GVIF bus was used circa 2000 onwards on many mid range vehicles including Land Rover Discovery 3, Range Rover, Lexus models and Toyota Prius. The GVIF bus was primarily for carrying the video signal between the integrated Satellite Navigation unit and the in vehicle display (also known as Head Unit). GVIF bus in these vehicles only carried video despite the specification allowing for data stuffing of other information.

External links 
  GVIF.com 
  Sony GVIF overview page
  GVIF Technology for Automotive Applications 

Serial buses
Physical layer protocols